Original Newburgh Historic District is a national historic district located at Newburgh, Warrick County, Indiana. It encompasses 27 contributing buildings in the central business district of Newburgh.  It developed between about 1850 and 1930, and includes representative examples of Italianate, Greek Revival, and Classical Revival style architecture. Located in the district is the separately listed Old Warrick County Jail.  Other notable buildings include the Evansville, Suburban, and Newburgh Railway Depot (1912); I.O.O.F. Building; Carnegie Library (1919); and Newburgh Bank (1902, 1918).

It was listed on the National Register of Historic Places in 1983.

References

Historic districts on the National Register of Historic Places in Indiana
Italianate architecture in Indiana
Greek Revival architecture in Indiana
Neoclassical architecture in Indiana
Historic districts in Warrick County, Indiana
National Register of Historic Places in Warrick County, Indiana